This Guitar is the ninth album by American folk rock musician David Dondero, released in October/November 2013. This album was made possible by a successful Kickstarter campaign, and was released shortly after Golden Hits. Vol 1.

Track listing
Roses and Rain
Boxer's Fracture
This Guitar
Samantha's Got A Bag Of Coal
Take a Left Turn in Boise
Aleuitious and the Typewriter Keys
Don't You Feel
Alcohol
There's No Tomorrow in This Song
New Berlin Wall
This Guitar (guitar Version)

References

External links
Ghostmeat Records – David Dondero Biography

2013 albums
David Dondero albums
Kickstarter-funded albums